Richard William Bull (June 26, 1924 – February 3, 2014) was an American film, stage and television actor. He was best known for his performances as "Doc" on Voyage to the Bottom of the Sea and Nels Oleson on Little House on the Prairie.

Personal life
Bull was born on June 26, 1924 in Zion, Illinois. After years of living in Los Angeles, he moved back to Chicago in 1994 with his wife Barbara Collentine. The couple moved to the Motion Picture & Television Fund House from Chicago in September 2012.

Bull fell into acting by accident. “I never gave a serious consideration about becoming an actor. As a senior in high school, I decided to study music, but a friend suggested we attend the Goodman Theater School. In two weeks the friend dropped out, but I was hooked.” There was a three-year interruption while he served as a radio operator for the Army Air Corps, but when he was discharged in 1946 he resumed his acting studies at Goodman.

Career
Bull began his stage career at the famous Goodman Theatre in Chicago. He said that a two-line part in The Greatest Story Ever Told "opened a lot of doors." Director George Stevens was impressed with Bull's emoting, and that "led directly to the role of an FBI agent in The Satan Bug," Bull said.

He made more than 100 film and TV appearances.

Death
Bull died on the morning of February 3, 2014, at the Motion Picture & Television Country House and Hospital in Calabasas, California of pneumonia. He was 89 years old.

Filmography

Film

Full of Life (1956) as Doctor (uncredited)
Fear Strikes Out (1957) as Reporter Slade (uncredited)
Operation Mad Ball (1957) as Military Police Sergeant (uncredited)
The True Story of Lynn Stuart (1958) as Customs Officer (uncredited)
But Not for Me (1959) as Ticket Seller (uncredited)
Then There Were Three (1961)
Della (1964) as Mark Nodella
The Satan Bug (1965) as Eric Cavanaugh
In Like Flint (1967) as Newscaster (uncredited)
Hour of the Gun (1967) as Thomas Fitch
How to Steal the World (1968) as Captain Gelser (archive footage)
The Thomas Crown Affair (1968) as Booth Guard
The Secret Life of an American Wife (1968) as Howard
The Stalking Moon (1968) as Doctor
Moonfire (1970) as Hawkins
Move (1970) as Keith
Lawman (1971) as Dusaine
The Andromeda Strain (1971) as an Air Force major
Man and Boy (1971) as Thornhill
Ulzana's Raid (1972) as Ginsford
High Plains Drifter (1973) as Asa Goodwin
The President's Plane is Missing (1973, TV Movie) as Flight Controller
Executive Action (1973) as a gunman on "Team A"
Breezy (1973) as Doctor
Newman's Law (1974) as Immigration Man
The Parallax View (1974) as Parallax Goon
Mr. Sycamore (1975) as Dr. Ferfield
A Different Story (1978) as Mr. Cooke
A Day in a Life (2000) as Will
The Secret (2001) as Grandpa
Let's Go to Prison (2006) as Board Member #2
Sugar (2008) as Earl Higgins
Witless Protection (2008) as Sheriff Smoot
Osso Bucco (2008) as Old Man Diner

Television

Perry Mason (1957 TV series) (1958 - 1st season episode 36) as Court Reporter in "The Case of the Prodigal Parent"
Men Into Space (1959) as Radio Operator in "Asteroid"
Highway Patrol (1959 - 4th season episode 25) as bank robber, Bert Nelson
Harrigan and Son (1961) as Lawson in "They Were All in Step But Jim"
Gunsmoke
 as Nort in "Collie's Free" (1962)
 as Deems in "The Sodbusters" (1972)
My Three Sons (1962) as J. C. Dobbins
The Eleventh Hour (1964) as Phil Whitman in "Sunday Father"
Voyage to the Bottom of the Sea (1964-1968 TV Series) as The Doctor, various episodes
Kentucky Jones (1965) as Harold Erkel in episodes "The Victim" and "The Return of Wong Lee"
Blue Light (1966) in episode "Sacrifice!"
Mission: Impossible (1966) as an agent for the Impossible Missions Force
The Andy Griffith Show 2 episodes as Bill Lindsay and Mr.JacksonMannix - (1968-1974) 7 episodes as 4 different charactersGomer Pyle, USMC (1966) as the psychologist in the episode "Gomer and the Little Space Men". Bonanza (1969-1972) as Jess Hill/Mr. Goodman (2 episodes)Columbo (1971) as 2nd Detective in episode "Lady in Waiting"Nichols (1971-1972) 5 episodes as ThatcherThe Partridge Family (1972) 1 episode as ThompsonThe Streets of San Francisco (1973-1974) as the coronerBarnaby Jones (1973-1976) 4 episodes as J.I. FletcherLittle House on the Prairie (1974-1983) as Nels OlesonWipeout (1976) as Sheriff SafianDead Man's Run as Mr. MooreBlind Terror (1973) as Mr. Strather
 Perchance to Kill (1973) as J.I. Fletcher
 The Harvey Korman Show (1978) as the Judge
 Hill Street Blues (1985) as Capt. Furillo's father
 Highway to Heaven (1985) as the doctor (2 episodes)
 It's Garry Shandling's Show as Stanley (1 episode)
 Highway to Heaven (1988) as Judge Wagner (1 episode)
 Designing Women (1988) as Everett
 ER (1999) as nice man on the train (1 episode)
 Normal (2003, TV Movie) as Roy, Sr.
 Boss'' (2011) as Elderly Farmer (final appearance)

References

External links

About Richard Bull

1924 births
2014 deaths
American male film actors
American male television actors
American male stage actors
People from Zion, Illinois
Male actors from Chicago
Deaths from pneumonia in California
United States Army Air Forces personnel of World War II
United States Army Air Forces soldiers